Yutta Barding (26 December 1880 – 12 March 1976) was a Danish fencer. She competed in the women's foil competition at the 1924 Summer Olympics.

References

External links
 

1880 births
1976 deaths
Danish female foil fencers
Olympic fencers of Denmark
Fencers at the 1924 Summer Olympics
Sportspeople from Frederiksberg